Emma Mogensen (born 24 September 1994) is a Danish handball player who currently plays for Aarhus United.

Achievements 
Danish Cup
Bronze Medalist: 2017

References
 

1994 births
Living people
Danish female handball players